The 1872 Flintshire by-election was fought on 2 March 1872.  The byelection was fought due to the incumbent MP of the Liberal Party, Lord Richard Grosvenor, becoming Vice-Chamberlain of the Household.  He was returned unopposed.

Results

See also
Lists of United Kingdom by-elections

References

1872 elections in the United Kingdom
1872 in Wales
1870s elections in Wales
March 1872 events
History of Flintshire
By-elections to the Parliament of the United Kingdom in Welsh constituencies
Unopposed ministerial by-elections to the Parliament of the United Kingdom in Welsh constituencies